Johanna Holmström (born 1981) is a Finland-Swedish author.

Holmström was born in Sipoo and lives in Helsinki. Her first publication was the short-story collection Inlåst och andra noveller (2003), from which the short story "Inlåst" ('Locked Up') was nominated for the Swedish Radio Short-story Prize in 2004. This was followed by the short story collection Tvåsamhet (‘Twosomeness’, 2005). Holmström's first novel was published in September 2007: Ur din längtan ('Out of your Longing'). In 2009 she won the Svenska Dagbladet Literature Prize for her third short-story collection Camera Obscura, a connected series of stories focused on young eco-terrorists in Helsinki. Since then, she has published Asfaltsänglar ('Asphalt Angels', 2013), Hush Baby (2015) and Själarnas ö (Island of Souls, 2017). Själarnas ö tells the stories of three of the inmates of a women-only mental hospital on the island of Själö near Turku.

Bibliography

 Inlåst och andra noveller (2003)
 Tvåsamhet (2005)
 Ur din längtan (2007)
 Camera obscura (2009)
 Asfaltsänglar (2013)
 Hush Baby (2015)
 Själarnas ö (2017)

Sources

 http://www.finlit.fi/fili/en/books/asphalt-angels/

1981 births
Living people
People from Sipoo
Finnish women novelists
Finnish writers in Swedish
Writers from Uusimaa